Blizzard is a 2003 American/Canadian Christmas-themed family film directed by LeVar Burton and starring Brenda Blethyn, Christopher Plummer, Kevin Pollak, and Whoopi Goldberg.

Plot
Ten-year old Jess is devastated after her friend Bobby moves out of town. Her mom's Aunt Millie comes to visit and decides to tell her a story about Katie, who is also ten years old, who wanted to ice-skate.

While practicing on an outdoor rink near her home, Katie is befriended by Otto Brewer, a former Olympic skating champion, who offers to teach her "proper skating," and under Otto's tutelage, Katie blossoms into a magnificent skater. However, Katie is devastated when her father loses his job and the family is forced to move to the big city.

Meanwhile, in the North Pole, Santa and his elves are celebrating the birth of Blizzard (Whoopi Goldberg), a baby reindeer born to Blitzen and Delphi. It quickly becomes apparent that Blizzard possesses all three magical reindeer gifts: the ability to fly, the power to make herself invisible, and the gift of empathic navigation - being able to see with her heart.

Using her empathic ability, Blizzard feels Katie's sadness and flies to Katie's home to investigate. Despite the rigid rules of the North Pole, Blizzard helps Katie learn that the value of true friendships is that they never truly go away. However, by breaking these rules, Blizzard must face the possibility of banishment at the hands of Archimedes, Santa's strict head elf. Only true friendship can save her now. Katie's former bully Erin becomes a humble friend after being saved from drowning in a thin-iced frozen pond by Katie, with Blizzard's help.

Cast

Awards
The film won the Best of the Fest award at the Chicago International Children's Film Festival, and the DGC Team Award from the Directors Guild of Canada. It premiered at the Cannes Film Festival on May 15, 2003.

See also
 List of Christmas films
 Santa Claus in film

External links
 
 
 

2003 films
American children's adventure films
American children's fantasy films
American Christmas films
American children's drama films
American fantasy adventure films
Canadian children's fantasy films
Canadian Christmas films
English-language Canadian films
Canadian drama films
Canadian fantasy adventure films
Films directed by LeVar Burton
Films shot in Ontario
Films about invisibility
2000s Christmas films
2000s fantasy adventure films
2003 directorial debut films
Santa Claus's reindeer
Santa Claus in film
Films about deer and moose
2000s English-language films
2000s American films
2000s Canadian films